On 23 March 2018, there was a series of Islamist terrorist attacks in the towns of Carcassonne and Trèbes in southern France. Redouane Lakdim, a 25-year-old French-Moroccan (born 11 April 1992 in Taza, Morocco), shot the two occupants of a car in Carcassonne, killing the passenger and hijacking it. He then opened fire on four police officers, seriously wounding one. Lakdim drove to nearby Trèbes, where he stormed a Super U supermarket, killing two civilians, wounding others, and taking at least one hostage. He swore allegiance to the Islamic State and demanded the release of Salah Abdeslam, the only surviving suspect of the November 2015 Paris attacks.

A senior gendarmerie officer, Lieutenant Colonel Arnaud Beltrame, voluntarily swapped places with a hostage. After a three-hour stand-off, Lakdim shot and fatally stabbed Beltrame. A police tactical unit immediately stormed the building and killed Lakdim. He was named a "soldier of the Islamic State" by the Amaq News Agency, and the President of France called the attacks an act of Islamist terrorism. Five people were killed in the attacks, including the perpetrator, and fifteen were wounded.

Background
Beginning in 2015, Europe was rocked by a series of terrorist attacks inspired by Islamic extremism, particularly by the Islamic State (ISIS). France in particular was affected by a series of attacks in January and in November, which killed 157 people in aggregate. By 2018, France was the European nation most affected by terrorist attacks inspired or directed by ISIS—from January 2015 to December 2018, 249 people were killed in France by Islamic terrorist attacks—and its security apparatuses were surveilling about 20,000 potential terrorists. Islamic terrorist attacks in France by 2018 mostly targeted law enforcement, rather than focusing on causing the maximum amount of civilian casualties; nine out of 11 attacks in France in 2017 were directed against French law enforcement.

Redouane Lakdim
Redouane Lakdim was born in Morocco on 11 April 1992 and became a naturalized citizen of France in 2004 when his father attained French citizenship. By 2018, Lakdim lived in Ozanam, a low-income neighborhood of the French city of Carcassonne, with his parents and sisters. Neighbors interviewed after the Carcassonne and Trèbes attack described him as a "pleasant young man". He was buried on 29 March 2018.

Lakdim was known to the police prior to the attacks and had been investigated as a possible extremist. In 2011, he was given a suspended sentence of a month in prison for possession of illegal weaponry and was imprisoned for August 2016 following a conviction, in 2015, for possession and use of narcotics and a refusal to comply with a court order. Lakdim, a devout Muslim, was noted by French authorities as a potential security hazard (Fiche S), then monitored in 2016 and 2017 on the suspicion that he had been radicalized. A search of his home after his death found notes referring to ISIS in what appeared to be a will. Lakdim's girlfriend was also known to French security services.

Attacks and hostage crisis
At 10:13 AM, after taking a sister to school, Lakdim approached a parked Opel Corsa and shot its two occupants with a handgun, killing Jean Mazières, a retired winemaker, and critically injuring Renato Silva, a Portuguese citizen. Lakdim stole the vehicle and drove to the barracks of the 3rd Marine Infantry Parachute Regiment. When no soldiers exited the barracks, he drove away and spotted four policemen of the Compagnies Républicaines de Sécurité jogging back to their barracks. From the vehicle, Lakdim fired six times at the officers, severely injuring one. After attempting without success to hit the officers with the vehicle, Lakdim drove  to Trèbes.

Lakdim arrived at Trèbes's Super U supermarket at 10:38 AM, and entered the store, which at that moment contained 50 people. Lakdim shouted "Allahu akbar" and his allegiance to ISIS, and shot and killed the store's butcher, Christian Medves, and Hervé Sosna, a retired mason. Hearing the gunshots, 20 occupants of the store escaped or hid in its cold store; those unable to were ordered by Lakdim to lie on the ground. He ordered one of the hostages to call the French police and inform them that he had taken hostages and again declared his allegiance to ISIS.

Hundreds of police and gendarmerie quickly arrived, cordoned off the area and helped to evacuate people. They found Lakdim holding several hostages, including a woman whom he used as a human shield. A GIGN unit assembled near the supermarket and Interior Minister Gérard Collomb arrived. Lakdim demanded the release of Salah Abdeslam, a primary suspect in the November 2015 Paris attacks. During the standoff, he briefly came out of the supermarket, threatening to "blow everything up". Police brought Lakdim's mother and two sisters to negotiate, unsuccessfully.

Police negotiated with Lakdim to release the hostages, and Arnaud Beltrame, a 44-year-old lieutenant colonel in the National Gendarmerie, offered to take the place of the final, female hostage, and Lakdim agreed. Beltrame set his mobile phone on a table inside with the phone line open, so the police outside could listen in. After a three-hour stand-off, Beltrame tried to disarm Lakdim and shouted "Assault! Assault!" loud enough to be heard through the phone. As a result, Beltrame was shot three or four times and fatally stabbed, while GIGN operatives immediately stormed the supermarket at 2:40 p.m. and exchanged gunfire with the assailant, killing him two minutes later. Two of the operatives were wounded. Shortly after, police dogs went into the building, and an ambulance and helicopter arrived in the car park. Beltrame was praised by Interior Minister Collomb and others for his heroism, but later died in hospital of his injuries. Autopsies found that Beltrame died from  stab wounds to the throat.

Aftermath
The attacks and hostage crisis resulted in five deaths, including Lakdim's, and injured 15 people.

Silva survived being shot in the head and was taken to Perpignan where he went into a coma. On 4 April, he came out of the coma but could not walk unassisted and suffered partial paralysis in the face and deafness in one ear. Portuguese President Marcelo Rebelo de Sousa visited Silva in hospital. He was released on 23 March and returned to his home in Villemoustaussou, Aude. He had initially been declared dead by the Portuguese consul.

Lakdim's girlfriend and an unspecified "friend" arrested for questioning at 7 PM, 23 March.

On 19 October 2018, three persons were indicted by French authorities in connection to Lakdim's actions.

Reactions
French Minister of the Interior Gérard Collomb, who was briefed on the situation in Trèbes from Saint-Cyr-au-Mont-d'Or, said he was "on his way to Trèbes" and arrived shortly after. President Emmanuel Macron said the hostage taking "appeared to be a terrorist act" and that he would return to Paris within hours to coordinate an official response.

President Macron later said Arnaud Beltrame "fell as a hero" and showed "exceptional courage", in what he described as an act of "Islamist terrorism".

Beltrame's name was the top trending hashtag on the French edition of Twitter on the morning he died due to tributes from France and elsewhere around the world. Gendarmerie stations across France flew flags at half-mast in his honour, and the Élysée Presidential Palace announced that a national tribute would be paid to him.

: Prime Minister Theresa May denounced the attack as "cowardly," and said the United Kingdom stood "in solidarity with our friends and allies in France, just as they always stand with us."

: Prime Minister Benjamin Netanyahu condemned the attack, sent condolences and said: "The civilized world must unite and work together in order to defeat terrorism". President Reuven Rivlin also denounced the attack, saying: "The whole free world must stand united and firm against terror: in Jerusalem, in France, and across the world."

: Prime Minister Justin Trudeau issued a statement of condemnation and solidarity against terrorism, and offered condolence on behalf of his citizens to victims' friends and families.

: President Donald Trump issued a statement on Twitter, condemning "the violent actions of the attacker and anyone who would provide him support." He continued, "we are with you @EmmanuelMacron!"

See also
List of terrorist incidents in France § 21st century

References

Aude
Crime in Occitania (administrative region)
GIGN missions
Hostage taking in France
ISIL terrorist incidents in France
Islamic terrorist incidents in 2018
March 2018 crimes in Europe
March 2018 events in France
Mass murder in 2018
Terrorist incidents in France in 2018
Terrorist incidents involving knife attacks
2018 mass shootings in Europe